Clemens Alois Baader, also spelled Klement Alois Baader or Klemens Alois Baader (8 April 1762 in Munich – 23 March 1838 in Munich) was a German Roman Catholic theologian.

Biography
He was the son of personal physician Joseph Franz von Paula Baader (1733–1794). He attended a high school in Munich before he studied theology at the University of Ingolstadt, where he earned a doctor's degree in philosophy (Dr. phil.). Then he was active in the consistories of Augsburg and Salzburg. He became a canon of Freising on August 25, 1787. He was appointed a member of the Academy of sciences of his native city on May 30, 1797, then of the Erfurt Academy of Sciences of Public Utility on July 10, 1797. He was called to Salzburg in 1811, then to Burghausen in 1816 and came back to his native town in on March 22, 1817. He spent his retirement in Munich and died in 1838. In 1807, he became a corresponding member of the Bavarian Academy of Sciences and Humanities

Works
 Fragmente a. d. Tagebuche eines Menschen und Christen (1791)
 Reisen durch verschiedene Gegenden Deutschlands in Briefen (two volumes; from 1795 to 1797)
 Eduards Briefe über die französische Revolution (1796)
 Gedanken und Vorschläge eines bairischen Patrioten in drei Briefen über Geistlichkeit und Landschulen (1801)
 Aussichten, Wünsche und Beruhigung fürs Vaterland (1801)
 Nothwendigkeit der individuellen Säcularisation etc. (1802)
 Das gelehrte Baiern oder Lexikon aller Schriftsteller, welche Baiern im 18. Jahrhundert erzeugte, A–K (1804; no further volume published)
 Kurze Geschichte der Kriegsvorfälle zu Ulm im Spätherbst 1805 (1806)
 Blumen aus verschiedenen Gärten, Aphorismen etc. (from 1822 to 1824)
 Freundschaftliche Briefe (1823)
 Lexikon verstorbener bairischer Schriftsteller des 18. und 19. Jahrhunderts (two volumes; from 1824 to 1825)

Bibliography

External links
 
 Werke Baaders, Bavarian State Library Online 
 Clemens Alois Baader, Bavarian Academy of Sciences and Humanities 

18th-century German Catholic theologians
19th-century German Catholic theologians
Members of the Bavarian Academy of Sciences
Clergy from Munich
1762 births
1838 deaths